

The "P" symbol or "P" badge was introduced on 8 March 1940 by the Nazi Germany General Government with relation to the requirement that Polish workers (Zivilarbeiter) used during World War II as forced laborers in Germany (following the German invasion and occupation of Poland in 1939) display a visible symbol marking their ethnic origin. The symbol was introduced with the intent to be used as a cloth patch, which indeed was the most common form, but also reproduced on documents (through stamps) and posters. The badge was intended to be humiliating, and like the similar Jewish symbol, can be seen as a badge of shame.

Design and usage 
The design was introduced in the Polish decrees (laws concerning Polish workers in Germany) of 8 March 1940. The symbol was a diamond with sides of five centimeters. The border (about half a centimetre wide) and the letter P (two and a half centimetres tall) were violet, while the inside of the symbol was yellow. The letter "P" badge was to be worn on the right breast of every garment worn. Those who did not obey the rules were subject to a fine of up to 150 Reichsmarks and arrested with a possible penalty of six weeks' detention.

The choice of color and shape might have been chosen to avoid any association with national symbols of Poland. It was the first official, public badge-like mark intended for identification of individuals based on their racial or ethnic origin (or other social characteristics) introduced in Nazi Germany, preceding the better-known "Jewish yellow star" badge introduced a year later, in September 1941.

In January 1945 the Central Office for Reich Security proposed a new design for a Polish badge, a yellow ear of corn on a red and white label, but it was never implemented.

Examples of usage

See also 
 Nazi concentration camp badge

References

Further reading 
 
 

Unfree labor during World War II
Nazi war crimes in Poland
Anti-Polish sentiment in Europe
Poland in World War II
Symbols introduced in 1940